In mathematics, a Clifford bundle is an algebra bundle whose fibers have the structure of a Clifford algebra and whose local trivializations respect the algebra structure. There is a natural Clifford bundle associated to any (pseudo) Riemannian manifold M which is called the Clifford bundle of M.

General construction

Let V be a (real or complex) vector space together with a symmetric bilinear form <·,·>. The Clifford algebra Cℓ(V) is a natural (unital associative) algebra generated by V subject only to the relation

for all v in V. One can construct Cℓ(V) as a quotient of the tensor algebra of V by the ideal generated by the above relation.

Like other tensor operations, this construction can be carried out fiberwise on a smooth vector bundle. Let E be a smooth vector bundle over a smooth manifold M, and let g be a smooth symmetric bilinear form on E. The Clifford bundle of E is the fiber bundle whose fibers are the Clifford algebras generated by the fibers of E:

The topology of Cℓ(E) is determined by that of E via an associated bundle construction.

One is most often interested in the case where g is positive-definite or at least nondegenerate; that is, when (E, g) is a Riemannian or pseudo-Riemannian vector bundle.  For concreteness, suppose that (E, g) is a Riemannian vector bundle. The Clifford bundle of E can be constructed as follows. Let CℓnR be the Clifford algebra generated by Rn with the Euclidean metric. The standard action of the orthogonal group O(n) on Rn induces a graded automorphism of CℓnR. The homomorphism

is determined by

where vi are all vectors in  Rn. The Clifford bundle of E is then given by

where F(E) is the orthonormal frame bundle of E. It is clear from this construction that the structure group of Cℓ(E) is O(n). Since O(n) acts by graded automorphisms on CℓnR it follows that Cℓ(E) is a bundle of Z2-graded algebras over M. The Clifford bundle Cℓ(E) can then be decomposed into even and odd subbundles:

If the vector bundle E is orientable then one can reduce the structure group of Cℓ(E) from O(n) to SO(n) in the natural manner.

Clifford bundle of a Riemannian manifold

If M is a Riemannian manifold with metric g, then the Clifford bundle of M is the Clifford bundle generated by the tangent bundle TM. One can also build a Clifford bundle out of the cotangent bundle T*M. The metric induces a natural isomorphism TM = T*M and therefore an isomorphism Cℓ(TM) = Cℓ(T*M).

There is a natural vector bundle isomorphism between the Clifford bundle of M and the exterior bundle of M:

This is an isomorphism of vector bundles not algebra bundles. The isomorphism is induced from the corresponding isomorphism on each fiber. In this way one can think of sections of the Clifford bundle as differential forms on M equipped with Clifford multiplication rather than the wedge product (which is independent of the metric).

The above isomorphism respects the grading in the sense that

Local description 

,

where the metric duality to change vector to the one form is used in the first term.

Then the exterior derivative  and coderivative  can be related to the metric connection  using the choice of an orthonormal base  by

.

Using these definitions, the Dirac-Kähler operator is defined by

.

On a star domain the operator can be inverted using Poincare lemma for exterior derivative and its Hodge star dual for coderivative. Practical way of doing this is by homotopy and cohomotopy operators.

See also
 Orthonormal frame bundle
 Spinor
 Spin manifold
 Spinor representation
 Spin geometry
 Spin structure
 Clifford module bundle

Notes

References

Clifford algebras
Vector bundles
Riemannian geometry